Alkino (Alkin) is a rural locality (a village) in Alkinsky Selsoviet, Chishminsky District, Bashkortostan, Russia. The population was 261 as of 2010. There are 20 streets.

Geography 
Alkino is located 23 km northeast of Chishmy (the district's administrative centre) by road. Uzytamak is the nearest rural locality.

References 

Rural localities in Chishminsky District